The 1966 Ole Miss Rebels football team represented the University of Mississippi during the 1966 NCAA University Division football season. The Rebels were led by 20th-year head coach Johnny Vaught and played their home games at Hemingway Stadium in Oxford, Mississippi and Mississippi Veterans Memorial Stadium in Jackson. The team competed as members of the Southeastern Conference, finishing in fourth. After starting 2–2 on the year, the Rebels began a six-game winning streak with a come-from-behind victory over upset-minded Southern Miss on homecoming. Ole Miss ended the regular season at 8–2, and were ranked 12th in the final Coaches Poll, which was conducted before bowl season. The AP Poll ranked only ten teams at the time. The Rebels were invited to the 1966 Bluebonnet Bowl, where they were shutout by Texas, 0–19.

Schedule

References

Ole Miss
Ole Miss Rebels football seasons
Ole Miss Rebels football